Marin Šparada (born 6 September 1996) is a Croatian professional water polo player. He is currently playing for VK Solaris. He is 6 ft 6 in (1.98 m) tall and weighs 225 lb (102 kg). His brother, Toni Šparada, is also water polo player.

References

External links 
VELIKO POJAČANJE Marin Šparada, 22-godišnji vratar reprezentativnog kalibra, vratio se iz 'Mornara' u Crnicu: Nesuđeni košarkaš na braniku 'Solarisa'
Glavni akter velike tučnjave na Poljudu: 'Nisam lud, pa bio sam okružen s trojicom suparničkih igrača!'
Žestoka tučnjava na Poljudu: vratar gostiju otišao u napad u posljednjim trenucima susreta i izazvao opću makljažu
Mornar i Solaris izdali zajedničko priopćenje: 'Šparada nije udario protivničkog igrača, sve je bilo u žaru borbe'
Glavni akter vatrene završnice susjedskog derbija na Poljudu ispričao je svoju priču, priznaje da mu je ovo prvi incident u kojem je sudjelovao

Living people
1996 births
Croatian male water polo players